This list contains all cultural property of national significance (class A) in the canton of Thurgau from the 2009 Swiss Inventory of Cultural Property of National and Regional Significance. It is sorted by municipality.

The geographic coordinates provided are in the Swiss coordinate system as given in the Inventory.

Aadorf

Altnau

Amlikon-Bissegg

Amriswil

Arbon

Berg

Berlingen

Bettwiesen

Bischofszell

Bürglen

Bussnang

Diessenhofen

Egnach

Erlen

Ermatingen

Eschenz

Fischingen

Frauenfeld

Gachnang

Gottlieben

Hauptwil-Gottshaus

Herdern

Hohentannen

Homburg

Hüttlingen

Hüttwilen

Kemmental

Kesswil

Kreuzlingen

Mammern

Märstetten

Müllheim

Münchwilen

Münsterlingen

Neunforn

Pfyn

Roggwil

Romanshorn

Salenstein

Schlatt

Schönholzerswilen

Sommeri

Steckborn

Stettfurt

Tägerwilen

Thundorf

Tobel-Tägerschen

Uesslingen-Buch

Wagenhausen

Warth-Weiningen

Weinfelden

Wigoltingen

Wuppenau

Zihlschlacht-Sitterdorf

References
 All entries, addresses and coordinates are from:

External links
 Swiss Inventory of Cultural Property of National and Regional Significance, 2009 edition:

PDF documents: Class B objects
Geographic information system